Sandra Williams may refer to:

 Sandra Williams (American politician)
Sandra Williams (Guyanese activist)
 Sandra Williams (Sark politician)

See also
Saundra Williams, from the Sharon Jones & the Dap-Kings.